The Gromov Nunataks are a group of nunataks lying  east-southeast of Mount Henry in the Scott Mountains of Enderby Land, Antarctica. They were named by the Soviet Antarctic Expedition, 1961–62, for M.M. Gromov, a Soviet pilot.

References

Nunataks of Enderby Land